Alba Farelo i Solé (born 7 March 1997), known professionally as Bad Gyal, is a Spanish singer, songwriter, DJ and model. Known for her distinctive overall use of Auto-Tune, Bad Gyal has developed a strong cult following ever since her musical career began in 2016 with her interpretation of Rihanna's "Work" in the Catalan language. She then continued to make music as an independent artist, releasing records like "Indapanden", "Jacaranda" or "Fiebre". Bad Gyal later released two mixtapes: Slow Wine Mixtape (2016) and Worldwide Angel (2018), which consecrated her as an emerging artist within the Spanish urban scene.

Farelo signed Interscope and Aftercluv a year later and saw mainstream acclaim with songs like "Santa María", "Zorra" or "Alocao", the latter becoming the number-one song in Spain in 2019. 2021 saw the release of her first project as a signed artist Warm Up, as well as Sound System: The Final Releases.

Other ventures of Bad Gyal besides music include fashion and modelling. She made her modelling debut at Andrés Sardá's Spring/Summer 2022 show at Madrid Fashion Week. As for social activism, Farelo has been an advocate for gender equality, LGBT rights and social justice.

Early life
Alba Farelo i Solé was born on 7 March 1997 in Vilassar de Mar, Barcelona. After taking , Farelo studied a degree in fashion design at the University of Barcelona. While attending university and working at a call centre, she released "Pai" in April 2016, an adaptation of "Work" by Rihanna in the Catalan language. She stated that she never meant for that song to become viral and that she just did it to create a funny memory with her group of friends. However, with that video Farelo became one of the first artists to sing typically Latin music genres in Catalan and was named one of the biggest musical promises in Spain after the cover was picked up by a local radio. While working in a bakery in her hometown, she decided to drop out of college to pursue a serious career in the music industry. She began as an independent artist singing covers and playing music in nightclubs in the province of Barcelona. She later became more interested in producing her own music and, with the money she made out of these gigs, she rented recording studios for limited hours and hired some producers. She would then release "Indapanden" and "No Pierdo Nada", among other songs produced by Fakeguido.

Career

2016–2018: Slow Wine Mixtape and Worldwide Angel
"Pai" gained popularity on YouTube, and was picked up by a local radio, which led to the creation of a mixtape, Slow Wine Mixtape, with producer Pablo Martínez. The mixtape was released on 9 November 2016. Through that era, she hit a page on several professional music magazines and websites including Pitchfork and Fact. Fact named her song "Jacaranda" the number 1 single of 2017. After releasing the mixtape's debut single "Fiebre", Bad Gyal started to grow exponentially in the areas of El Maresme, Barcelona, and other points of Spain. Throughout the years, the song has developed a cult following and has been catalogued as a must play at clubs and music festivals. As "Fiebre" was having a lot of success, she was offered many record deals, which she turned down after some legal advises by lawyers and her dream to continue as an independent artist. The success of the mixtape and its critical acclaim led Farelo to perform at several festivals in Iceland and Japan, as well as the Red Bull Music Academy Festival in Los Angeles, and Sónar in Barcelona. In late 2017 she also toured Mexico and the United States.

In February 2018, she released her second mixtape to critical acclaim, which she titled Worldwide Angel. The album was licensed and distributed with Canada Editorial. The mixtape was produced by Jam City, Dubbel Dutch, Florentino and el Guincho. It spawned many singles including "Blink", "Candela" and "Internationally". The last one was included in the digital soundtrack of the first season of the Netflix teen drama series Élite and was featured in an episode. To promote the album, she took part of international festivals such as SXSW and Lollapalooza and toured once again the United States. During winter season she embarked on her first Asian tour, which visited countries like Japan, China and the Philippines. She also released "Open the Door" featuring Jamaican singer Govana, "Yo sigo iual" and "Unknown Feeling".

2019–2021: Commercial breakthrough and Warm Up
Formerly signed with the production company Canada Editorial, in April 2019 it was announced Farelo had signed with Interscope Records and Aftercluv Dance Lab. The next month she was featured in Spanish Vogue. As a signed artist, Farelo moved to a more mainstream field with her first release being the long-anticipated "Santa María" featuring Busy Signal. It marked Farelo's first charting song in Spain. It was later certified gold. A couple weeks later she released its B-side track, "Hookah", which peaked at 55 in Spain. During the summer she embarked on her third solo tour Bad Gyal Soundsystem, which visited many festivals including Sónar, Jameson Urban Routes, Hellow, Arenal Sound and Ceremonia, among others. In October 2019 Farelo collaborated with Omar Montes on "Alocao", which eventually became huge in Spain and selected parts of Latin America. The song peaked at number one in Spain for several weeks and was certified five times platinum. Two months later, she released her biggest commercial solo track to date, "Zorra", which peaked at number two and was certified three times platinum in Spain. Bad Gyal offered two major solo sold-out concerts at Razzmatazz and another sold-out one at La Riviera. The Soundsystem show was expected to begin a major Spanish and Latin American leg starting 8 March 2020, but could only do three shows due to the COVID-19 pandemic. Appearances at festivals like Estéreo Picnic and Primavera Sound were cancelled while the whole tour was postponed to 2021.

During the pandemic, Farelo was featured on Kafu Banton's "Tú eres un bom bom", which would later be remixed in collaboration with Guaynaa. She also released "Aprendiendo el sexo" later on, with a music video produced by Canada and filmed at the luxurious W Hotel Barcelona. In November, she paired with Juanka and released "Blin blin" to commercial success and the acclaim of the general public. The track became viral in her home country and had a significant use on TikTok. She also partnered with Vodafone and offered a unique virtual concert.

Bad Gyal released her first extended play Warm Up on 19 March 2021 with her latest releases including the controversial Rauw Alejandro "Zorra" remix and the YouTube censored "Pussy". The EP peaked at 5 in Spain. She also collaborated with clothing brand Bershka and released an exclusive clothing line. On 25 June, she collaborated with Mariah Angeliq and María Becerra on "Bobo", which sampled TLC's "No Scrubs" and sparked controversy due to similarity with Luchy DR's "Bufón". As tour season came to an end, Farelo published "Flow 2000" as well as her second extended play Sound System: The Final Releases featuring songs she had been performing live for years yet remained unreleased. She parallelly released "A la mía" exclusively for the Grand Theft Auto Online radio station Motomami Los Santos hosted by Rosalía and Arca.

Awards and nominations

Discography

Albums

Studio albums

Mixtapes

Extended plays

Singles

As lead artist

As featured artist

Other charted songs

Guest appearances

Videography

Music videos

Television

Tours

Headlining
 Slow Wine Tour (2017)
 International Bad Gyal Sound System (2019–2021)
 La Joia Tour (2022)

Notes

References

External links

 
 

 
1997 births
21st-century Spanish women singers
21st-century Spanish singers
Dancehall singers
Feminist musicians
Interscope Records artists
Living people
Spanish LGBT rights activists
People from Vilassar de Mar
Reggaeton musicians
Spanish electronic musicians
Spanish feminists
Spanish pop singers
Spanish women singers
Spanish women singer-songwriters
Universal Music Latino artists
University of Barcelona alumni